Mamnoon Hussain (23 December 1940 – 14 July 2021) was a Pakistani politician and industrialist who served as the 12th president of Pakistan from 2013 to 2018. He was first appointed Governor of Sindh in June 1999 by President Rafiq Tarar; but was removed from the post in October 1999 due to the 1999 military coup d'état. Hussain was then nominated for the presidency by the PMLN in July 2013 and was elected through an indirect presidential election. Hussain took over the presidency after an oath administered by the Chief Justice of Pakistan on 9 September 2013. Hussain maintained a low-key profile as president and his role was rarely seen in the nation's politics, although he was involved in a polio eradication program.

Personal life
Mamnoon Hussain was born in Agra, British India in 1940 to Ustad Zafar Hussain. His family's ancestral occupation was in the trade of leather and footwear. They moved to Karachi in 1949. After being homeschooled, Hussain enrolled in the Karachi University where he studied for the Commerce degree. After graduating from the Karachi University in 1963, he entered in the master's program at the Institute of Business Administration (IBA) in Karachi, and obtained his MBA degree in 1965.

Initially supporting and strengthening his father's business, he later founded his own textile company in Karachi. He later joined the center-right Pakistan Muslim League in 1970, working as a party worker. In 1997, he earned public notability as a business leader when he was elected as president of the Karachi Chamber of Commerce & Industry, serving until May 1999.

Political career

Hussain began to take interest in national politics in 1968 when he became chairman and joined the Pakistan Muslim League (PML) led by Nurul Amin. Initially, an activist with reformist zeal in 1968, Hussain became joint secretary of the Pakistan Muslim League's Karachi chapter. In 1993, he officially joined the PML(N) led by Nawaz Sharif and was appointed the Finance Secretary of the PML(N) in Sindh.

In June 1999, he became the Governor of Sindh, but his term was cut short on 12 October 1999 when the PML(N) government was ousted in a military coup. His credentials as a politician devoted to the cause of democracy were established when he became a political prisoner after raising his voice against the military regime of Pervez Musharraf.

Azhar Haroon, the former president of the Karachi Chamber of Commerce and Industry, said: "He had no political affiliation until 1999 but his polite discourse and professional ability impressed Nawaz Sharif, who appointed him as the Governor of Sindh". He was a relatively lesser-known figure, described as loyal to Nawaz Sharif, and was elected as President of Pakistan as the official nominee of the PML-N in the July 2013 presidential election. Hussain secured 432 votes and his only rival Wajihuddin Ahmed received 77. He was sworn in on 9 September 2013 in a ceremony held at Aiwan-e-Sadr, attended by mainstream political and military leadership alongside foreign dignitaries, media personnel and his close relatives. At the time of assuming the office of president, he became the second oldest president of Pakistan. His term for the presidency ended on 8 September 2018. He was the second President of Pakistan whose family migrated to Pakistan from India after the Partition of India. He belonged to an ethnic Muhajir Family.

Criticism of his own party
On 19 October 2017 while giving a speech at the USTB, Hussain blasted the leadership of his own party saying that the government had taken a loan of 14,800 billion PKR but no new schools or hospitals had been built in the past 4 years. The speech was ignored and not broadcast on mainstream media.

Death
In February 2020, Hussain was diagnosed with cancer and was under treatment. On 14 July 2021, he died in Karachi, aged 79.

See also
President of Pakistan
Federal Secretary
List of presidents of Pakistan

References

External links

 Mamnoon Hussain takes oath as Twelfth President 
 Profile page (in Urdu)
 Mamnoon Hussain submits nomination papers for presidential election
 Mamnoon Hussain nomination as PML-N presidential candidate

|-

1940 births
2021 deaths
Businesspeople from Karachi
Governors of Sindh
Indian emigrants to Pakistan
Institute of Business Administration, Karachi alumni
Muhajir people
Pakistan Muslim League (N) politicians
Pakistani anti-communists
Pakistani democracy activists
Pakistani financiers
Pakistani industrialists
Pakistani Muslims
People from Agra
People from Karachi
Politicians from Karachi
Presidents of Pakistan
University of Karachi alumni
Deaths from cancer in Pakistan